2000 Uganda Cup was the 26th season of the main Ugandan football Cup.

Overview
The competition was known as the Kakungulu Cup and was won by SC Villa who beat Military Police FC 1-0 in the final. The results available for the earlier rounds are incomplete.

Quarter-finals
The 4 matches in this round were played between 13 October and 15 October 2000.

Semi-finals
The semi-finals were played on 3 November 2000.

Final
The final was played on 21 January 2001.

Footnotes

External links
 Uganda - List of Cup Finals - RSSSF (Mikael Jönsson, Ian King and Hans Schöggl)

Ugandan Cup
Uganda Cup
Cup